Greyhound racing in the United States is a sport and gambling activity. The industry is regulated by state or local law and greyhound care is regulated by the National Association of State Racing Commission and the American Greyhound Council (AGC). The AGC is jointly run by the National Greyhound Association. 

In recent years many greyhound tracks have closed due to declining betting revenue, encroachment by Native American gaming and commercial casino gambling into states with greyhound racing, the legalization of sports betting and concerns over the welfare of racing greyhounds. Although many states offer online advance-deposit wagering as well as off-track betting and race and sports book betting, and most tracks currently simulcast racing from other tracks, as of 2023, only two tracks currently conduct actual live racing onsite, both in West Virginia.

History
The first greyhound in the United States was registered in 1894 and the oval form of racing with a mechanical or artificial hare was started by Owen Patrick Smith in 1912. California was the first state to introduce an oval greyhound track in May 1920, it was the first mechanical lure oval circuit in the world. Smith opened the track at Emeryville. The Emeryville arena was torn down in February 1920 to make way for the construction of a modern racetrack using the mechanical lure, described in the press as the "automatic rabbit"   The first race at the new park was on Saturday, May 29, 1920 

A greyhound called Joe Dump set a world record of 31 race wins in 1978 and 1979; the red brindle dog was trained by JC Stanley and owned by Joe Fallon and raced primarily at Greenetrack. The record was subsequently beaten by Ballyregan Bob. On 4 June 1994 a greyhound bitch called Pat C Rendezvous won her 33rd consecutive race to break Ballyregan Bob's world record and went on to win 36 consecutive races. In 1995, a greyhound called JJ Doc Richards won his 37th consecutive greyhound race to beat Pat C Rendezvous' record. In 1998, a greyhound called Leos Midas won for the 103rd time to equal the United States record number of total races won, the race was at Orange Park.

In November 2018, Florida voters passed a constitutional referendum banning live greyhound racing at Florida tracks after December 31, 2020. Live Greyhound racing in Florida ended on December 31, 2020. A number of Florida tracks had closed earlier in 2020 due to the COVID-19 pandemic and never reopened and the rest were closed by 31 December 2020.

Welfare

At American tracks, greyhounds are kept in kennel compounds, most kennels turn the dogs out 4 to 6 times per day. Each turnout can be from 30 to 90 minutes. Because greyhound kennels often house upwards of 50–70 dogs, crating is essential to the safety and wellbeing of canine life.

In addition to state law and regulations, most tracks adopt their own rules, policies and procedures. In exchange for the right to race their greyhounds at the track, kennel owners must sign contracts in which they agree to abide by all track rules, including those pertaining to animal welfare. If kennel owners violate these contract clauses, they stand to lose their track privileges and even their racing licenses.  In order to be licensed to own, handle a race dog or work in a kennel, dog professionals must have an FBI background check and be licensed by the states.  Additionally, the National Greyhound Association holds their membership to strict standards towards the care and handling of the dogs. Failure to comply can result in lifetime termination of membership and a ban from the sport.

Criticism
In Florida the amount gambled at dog tracks declined by 72% between 1990 and 2013.  According to a study commissioned by the legislature, the state lost between $1 million and $3.3 million on greyhound racing in 2012.  As recently as 2016, Florida industry professionals questioned if wagering was declining or transitioning to unreported online formats.

In 2017, an animal rights organization alleged that a Pet Blood Bank in Texas was using former racing greyhounds for blood draws, and that the dogs were housed in unacceptable conditions. The farm was unconnected to the National Greyhound Association (NGA) who subsequently barred members from sending greyhounds to blood banks.

Active tracks
As of 2023, there are currently only two active greyhound racetracks in the United States, both in the state of West Virginia and owned by hospitality conglomerate Delaware North. The company has noted that they make very little profit on live greyhound racing, but turn a modest profit on simulcasting. In November 2022, a spokesperson for Delaware North noted that the company "would support legislation to run its casinos without greyhound racing", and that year's change in the makeup of the West Virginia Legislature could see support for it dwindle.

In addition to West Virginia, live greyhound racing is still legal, though not currently practiced in the states of Arkansas, Alabama, Texas, Kansas, Iowa, Wisconsin and Connecticut. 

Simulcast, off-track betting, race and sports book betting, and/or online advance-deposit wagering of live greyhound racing from elsewhere remains legal in Alabama, Arizona, Arkansas, Colorado, Connecticut, Florida, Idaho, Iowa, Kansas, Louisiana, Massachusetts, Montana, Nevada, New Hampshire, New Mexico, North Dakota, Oregon, Rhode Island, South Dakota, Texas, West Virginia, Wisconsin and Wyoming.

West Virginia
 Mardi Gras Casino and Resort, Cross Lanes (1985–present)
formerly known as Tri-State Greyhound Park
 Wheeling Island Hotel-Casino-Racetrack, Wheeling (1976–present)

Closed tracks by state

Alabama
Birmingham Race Course in Birmingham (1987–2020)
Greenetrack, Eutaw (1977–1997)
Mobile Greyhound Park, Theodore (1973–2017)
Victoryland, Shorter (1984–2011)

Arizona
Amado Greyhound Park, Amado (1963–1983)
Apache Greyhound Park, Apache Junction (1959–2004)
Black Canyon Greyhound Park, Black Canyon City (1965–1982)
Phoenix Greyhound Park, Phoenix (1954–2009)
Tucson Greyhound Park, South Tucson (1944–2016)
Yuma Greyhound Park, Yuma (1965–1993)

Arkansas
Southland Park Gaming and Racing, West Memphis (1956–December 2022)

California
 Baden Kennel Club, San Francisco (1933 - 1937)
 Blue Star Amusement Park, Emeryville (1920)

Colorado
Clover Leaf, Loveland (1955–2006)
Interstate, Byers (1971–2006)
Mile High, Commerce City (1949–2008)
Pueblo Greyhound Park, Pueblo (1949–1999)
Rocky Mountain Greyhound Park, Colorado Springs (1948–2005)

Connecticut
 Plainfield Greyhound Park, Plainfield (1976–2005)
 Shoreline Star Greyhound Park, Bridgeport (1995–2006)

Florida

 Biscayne Greyhound Track, Miami Shores (1926–1995)
 Daytona Beach Racing and Card Club, Daytona Beach (1948–2020)  
 Derby Lane Greyhound Track, St. Petersburg (1925–2020)
 Ebro Greyhound Track, Ebro (1955–2019)
 Flagler Greyhound Track, Miami (1932–2018)
 Hialeah Park Race Track, Miami (1922–2001?)
 Hollywood Greyhound Track, Hallandale Beach (1934–2020)
 Jacksonville Greyhound Track, Jacksonville (1935–2007)
 Jefferson County Kennel Club, Monticello (1959–2020)
 Key West Greyhound Track, Key West (1953–1991)
 Miami Beach Kennel Club, Miami Beach (1928–1980)
 Melbourne Greyhound Park, Melbourne (1990–2020)
 Naples-Fort Myers Track and Entertainment Center, Bonita Springs (1957–2020)
 Orange Park Kennel Club, Orange Park (1946–2020)
 Palm Beach Kennel Club, West Palm Beach (1932–2020)
 Pensacola Greyhound Track, Pensacola (1946–2019)
 St. Johns Bayard Greyhound Track, Jacksonville (1977–2000)
 Sanford-Orlando Kennel Club, Longwood (1935–2020)
 Sarasota Kennel Club, Sarasota (1944–2020)
 Seminole Greyhound Park, Casselberry (1981–2000)
 Tampa Greyhound Track, Tampa (1933–2015)

Idaho
 Coeur d’Alene Greyhound Park, Post Falls (1988–1995)

Illinois
 Grove Park Greyhound Track, Glenview (1926–1934)

Iowa
 Bluffs Run, Council Bluffs (1986–2015)
 Dubuque Greyhound Park / Q Casino, Dubuque (1985–2022)
 Waterloo Greyhound Park, Waterloo (1986–1996)

Kansas
 Camptown Greyhound Park, Frontenac (1995–1996)
 The Woodlands, Kansas City (1989–2008)

Massachusetts
 Raynham Greyhound Park, Raynham (1940–2009)
 Wonderland Greyhound Park, Revere (1935–2010)

Montana
 Great Falls Dog Track, Great Falls (1950's)

Nevada
 Las Vegas Downs, Henderson (1981 - 1983)

New Hampshire
 Belmont Lakes Region Greyhound Track, Belmont (1975–2005)
 Hinsdale Greyhound Park, Hinsdale (1973–2008)
 Seabrook Greyhound Park, Seabrook (1973–2010)

New Jersey
 Union Kennel Club, Linden (1930's)

New York
 Nassau Kennel Club, Mineola, Long Island (1930's)

Oregon
 Multnomah Greyhound Park, Fairview (1933–2004)

Rhode Island
 Twin River Casino / Lincoln Greyhound Park, Lincoln (1977–2009)

South Dakota
 Black Hills, Rapid City (1949–1994)
 Sodrac Park, Sioux City (1955–1995)

Texas
Valley Race Park, Harlingen (1990–2017)  
Gulf Greyhound Park, La Marque (1992–2020)
 Gulf Coast Racing, Corpus Christi (1990–2020)

Vermont
 Green Mountain Race Track, Pownal (1976–1991)

Wisconsin
 Dairlyland Greyhound Park, Kenosha (1990–2019)
 Fox Valley Greyhound Park, Kaukauna (1990 - 1995)
 Geneva Lakes Kennel Club, Delavan (1990 - 2005)
 St Croix Meadows Greyhound Race Park, Hudson (1991 - 2001)
 Wisconsin Dells, Lake Delton (1990 -1996)

References

United States